Pine Creek Wildlife Management Area is a scientifically managed preserve of natural and native wildlife flora and fauna.  It is located in Pushmataha County and McCurtain County, Oklahoma, adjacent to Pine Creek Lake, seven miles (11 km) north of Valliant, Oklahoma.

It is adjacent to Little River and its impoundment, Pine Creek Lake, which offers additional and coextensive protected areas for wildlife.

Ecosystem
Trees include six species of oak as well as ash, hickory, pine, river birch, and willow.  Sand plum, holly, sumac, and a great variety of grasses and legumes are also present.

Soil types range from deep sand to rocky.

Game species are abundant:  bobwhite quail, whitetail deer, eastern wild turkeys, cottontail rabbits and swamp rabbits, coyote, bobcats, beavers, mink, raccoons, doves, and geese may all be found in varying numbers.

Nongame species are also in evidence:  black bear, river otters, and bald eagles are also part of the WMA's ecosystem.  None of these nongame species may be hunted.  Eagles winter at Pine Creek Lake and travel the Little River watershed.

Management
Intensive management practices maintain old farm field habitat, as well as a variety of natural landscapes.  Approximately  of food plots are planted yearly. Management practices include burning, plowing, and brush hogging provide native plant food resources and maintain habitat diversity.

See also
 List of Oklahoma Wildlife Management Areas

References

External links
 Pine Creek Wildlife Management Area - Oklahoma Department of Wildlife Conservation 

Protected areas of Oklahoma
Protected areas of McCurtain County, Oklahoma
Protected areas of Pushmataha County, Oklahoma